Rutherford + Chekene is a structural and geotechnical engineering firm in California specializing in new design and retrofit of structures for clients in sectors that include healthcare, higher education, corporate, research and development, art and education, and technology.

Rutherford + Chekene began implementing 3-D modeling to produce building information models (BIM) in 2005. R+C has developed more than $3 billion in construction using BIM created with Revit, Tekla and other software.

Notable projects
Structural engineer of record for the new Jan Shrem and Maria Manetti Shrem Museum of Art at UC Davis 
Seismic consulting for bridging documents and structural and geotechnical peer review of the San Francisco International Airport Air Traffic Control Tower
UCSF Smith Cardiovascular Research Building at Mission Bay
UC Merced Science and Engineering Building 2, Merced
New Exploratorium, San Francisco
UC Berkeley Boalt Hall Law Library, Berkeley
UC Davis Gallagher Hall and Conference Center for the UC Davis Graduate School of Management, Davis
Designing for Wind Loads on Solar Arrays, California
De Young Museum, San Francisco
Monterey Bay Aquarium, Monterey
Monterey Bay Aquarium Research Institute, Moss Landing
Renovation and expansion of the UC Santa Cruz McHenry Library, Santa Cruz
Genentech Hall, QB3, and hospital at the UCSF Mission Bay campus
Pixar Animation Studios, Emeryville
California Strong Motion Instrumentation Program (CSMIP) Study
Geotechnical engineer of record for the California Academy of Sciences in Golden Gate Park
Seismic consulting after the 2011 Christchurch earthquake, New Zealand

References

King, John. "Davis: Design chosen for Shrem art museum", San Francisco Chronicle, May 2013.
Young, Eric. "Rehab/renovation: The Exploratorium at Pier 15," San Francisco Business Times, March 2013.
Rauber, Chris. "Finalist / best health: Mills-Peninsula Medical Center," San Francisco Business Times, March 2012.
Gonchar, Joann. "One Project, but Many Seismic Solutions", Architectural Record. 
Talarico, Wendy. "Seismic Systems that Stand Up to Nature", Architectural Record, February 2000.

Engineering companies of the United States
Business services companies of the United States
Companies based in San Francisco
Design companies established in 1960
1960 establishments in California